The 2022 African Wrestling Championships was a wrestling competition. The competition was originally scheduled to be held in El Jadida, Morocco, during 6–11 April 2021, then was postponed to 17–22 May 2022 at the same venue.

Medals

Seniors

Juniors (U20)

Cadets (U17)

Team ranking

Medal summary

Men's freestyle

Men's Greco-Roman

Women's freestyle

References

External link 
UWW

African Wrestling Championships
Africa
International sports competitions hosted by Morocco
African Wrestling Championships
African Wrestling
African Wrestling Championships
African Wrestling